Tocando Madera is the third album of the Puerto Rican rock band Sol D'Menta. It is their first live album, and it was recorded September 2, 1999 during a presentation of the band at the Hard Rock Cafe in San Juan, Puerto Rico. The album was released by on April 25, 2000.

Track listing 
 "Hay que pensar" - 5:01
 "La Calle" - 2:45
 "La Rumba" - 3:45
 "Cachetera" - 4:45
 "El Arte de Olvidar" - 5:45
 "Perro Callejero" - 6:45
 "Rosa" - 7:45
 "Sentido Contrario" - 8:45
 "Skalamientos" - 9:45
 "Funkadelicpsycomenta" - 10:45
 "Cerro Maravilla" - 11:45
 "Oubao Moin" (Roy Brown, Juan Antonio Corretjer) - 12:45
 "Inconforme" - 13:45

Musicians

Band Members
 Omar Hernández - vocals
 Erick "Jey" Seda - bass
 Miguel "Tito" Rodríguez - guitar
 Ernesto "Che" Rodríguez - drums

Personnel
 Mixed at Sound Junkie Recording, Cupey, Puerto Rico
 Recording and mix Engineer - Leo Alvarez
 Live Sound Engineer - Eddie Román
 Mastered at Kitchen Mastering Studio, North Carolina
 Mastering Engineer - Brend Lambert
 Live Production Assistant - Héctor Luis Blancovitch

2000 live albums
Sol D'Menta albums